Petri Jukka Mikael Laurila (born 8 February 1975), better known by his stage name Petri Nygård, is a Finnish rapper. He is also known under alias Dream (in rap duo Nuera) and as Travis Bicle. 

He has gained notoriety for his sexually explicit and misogynistic lyrics and his provocative stage shows (which often include nude women, pyrotechnics, drunk fans and giant inflatable vagina sculptures). His lyrical themes often focus on alcohol, parties, sex, women, pornography, hangover, masturbation, dissing Finnish celebrities and satirizing popculture and phenomena.

Early life

Petri Laurila is of Sweden-Finnish origin: he was born in Kristianstad, Sweden, and spent his childhood in Sweden. After serving briefly in the army, he moved to Chicago and eventually to Finland, residing in Tampere and Helsinki. He found initial success in his online release Vitun Suomirokki in 2000 on "Poko Rekords" going platinum with sales of 17,000 copies. The follow-up single entitled "Kanava Nolla (antakaa mun olla)" was also successful selling 9,000 copies. His debut studio album Mun levy! went gold with sale of 25,000 copies.

Nuera

Petri Laurila started his career as part of the rap duo Nuera. He was known as an MC under the alias Dream whereas his partner in the band was Henry Kaprali known as Skem. They were active in the 1990s releasing several cassettes through Open Records. They also collaborated with other artists on the record label.

In 2004-2004, both Dream and Skem joined DJ K2 in "YleX" weekly radio show featuring rap and R&B artists.

Travis Bicle
The duo disbanded as Henry Kapralin (Skem) moved to New York City going into music production with "Turnin' Records".

As for Petri Laurila (Dream) he took a new alias Travis Bicle and released an album in 2007 entitled "Committed" produced by Kapralin and "Turnin' Records"

Solo as Petri Nygård
Petri Laurila continued with a successful rap career taking the name Petri Nygård. After the successes of 2000 and 2001, he has had a considerable comeback starting 2009 with new download only releases. He also released in 2009 a full studio album entitled Kaikkee pitää olla. His new album scheduled for February 2011 is entitled Kaikki tai ei mitään. The single from the new album include the November 2010 single "Sarvet esiin" featuring Finnish thrash metal band Mokoma. The second single entitled "Selvä päivä" featuring Lord Est has shot to #1 on Suomen virallinen lista, the official Finnish singles chart.

Discography

Albums
with Nuera
1992: Nuera (tape)
1993: Nuera demo
1993: Nuera Underground tape
1994: Breakfast
1996: Nuera (EP)
2000: Honesty
2003: Own World
as Travis Bicle
2007: Committed
Solo
2000: Pillumagneetti (EP)
2000: Mun levy!
2001: Petri presidentixi
2002: Hovinarrin paluu!
2009: Kaikkee pitää olla
2011: Kaikki tai ei mitään
2012: Mun mielestä
2012: 29 Syntiä - Kaikki vitun hitit
2013: Valmis mihin vaan
2020: Alaston Suåmi

Singles
with Nuera
2001: "Upsteps"
2003: "Upsteps Reprise"
Solo
2000: "Vitun suomirokki"
2000: "Kanava nolla (Antakaa mun olla)"
2000: "Rääväsuu"
2000: "Hulluna tisseihin"
2001: "Petri hallitsee liigaa"
2001: "Riimini rupiset / Sika / Petri pelastaa joulun"
2009: "Sanon suoraan" (download only)
2009: "Onko sulla pokkaa?" (download only)
2009: "Mitävittuuvaan / Tuska" (download only)
2010: "Kippis kulaus" (download only)
2010: "Seopetriii" featuring Emel & Aajee (download only)
2010: "Sarvet esiin" featuring Mokoma
2010: "Selvä päivä" featuring Lord Est
2011: "Villi ja vitun vapaa"
2012: "Märkää"

Featured in
2011: "Reggaerekka" (Lord Est feat. Petri Nygård)

References

External links
Official website
Artist bio at Poko Records
Jpop entry

Finnish rappers
Living people
1975 births
Swedish people of Finnish descent
Finnish expatriates in the United States
Dirty rap musicians